Matteo Merini (born 21 January 1988) is an Italian professional footballer who is currently playing as a striker for Gavorrano.

Club career
Lazio loaned him to  the Polish club Kmita Zabierzów in early 2008. He was supposed to become one of the very few Italians players in the Polish club competitions, but he broke his jaw in two places in a friendly game and returned to Italy without making a league appearance for Kmita.

References

External links
 
 

1988 births
Footballers from Rome
Living people
Italian footballers
Association football forwards
S.S. Lazio players
A.S.D. Gallipoli Football 1909 players
A.S. Melfi players
A.S.D. Sangiovannese 1927 players
Carrarese Calcio players
U.S. Pistoiese 1921 players
Santarcangelo Calcio players
U.S. Gavorrano players
Serie C players
Italian expatriate footballers
Expatriate footballers in Poland
Italian expatriate sportspeople in Poland